Anwara is a 1967 Bangladeshi film which stars Razzak and Suchonda in lead roles. It is one of the six films where Razzak and Suchonda shared screen time.

References

1967 films
Bangladeshi drama films
Bengali-language Pakistani films
Films directed by Zahir Raihan
1960s Bengali-language films
films scored by Altaf Mahmud